Bengt Peter Cederwall (born 26 June 1954) is a Swedish curler.

Teams

Personal life

References

External links
 

Living people
1954 births
Swedish male curlers
20th-century Swedish people